Rosen Vankov (born 21 March 1985) is a Bulgarian football defender who currently plays for OFC Etar. He had previously played for Etar 1924 and Botev Vratsa.

Career statistics
As of 1 August 2014

References

External links
 

1985 births
Living people
Bulgarian footballers
FC Etar 1924 Veliko Tarnovo players
FC Botev Vratsa players
First Professional Football League (Bulgaria) players

Association football defenders